The Legatum Institute is a think tank based in London, UK, headed by Philippa Stroud, Baroness Stroud, a Conservative member of the House of Lords. Its stated aim is to advance the education of the public in national and international political, social and economic policy. The Institute has over forty donors including the Legatum Foundation. It has been called "arguably the most influential think tank in Britain pushing its free market pro-Brexit vision and enjoying privileged access to media and ministers" but it has attracted controversy as a result of its opaque, offshore funding.

History, operations and funding 
The Legatum Institute was founded in 2007, funded by the Dubai-based Legatum Group under its owner Christopher Chandler, a businessman and hedge fund owner. Chandler and his brother, Richard, made their money in Russia in the 1990s/2000s and at one time had a 4% stake in the Russian state-owned company, Gazprom. The Institute is a beneficiary of his family foundation, Legatum Foundation. The foundation is registered in Bermuda and controlled by a company in the Cayman Islands. 

In 2018, it was criticised by the Charity Commission for breaching its charitable objectives in publishing a partial and biased account of the benefits of free trade post-Brexit. It was closely aligned with the Vote Leave campaign giving fellowships to the campaign's chair, Gisela Stuart, and its CEO, Matthew Elliott. In 2017, it set up a "Special Trade Commission" headed by Shanker Singham, who became a prominent pro-Brexit voice across the media.

It claims to be funded by more than 40 donors. These are not listed on its site or in its financial declarations. The Institute is currently located in Mayfair. Philippa Stroud (formerly Executive Director of the Centre for Social Justice, and a Conservative Party Peer in the House of Lords) was appointed CEO of the Legatum Institute in 2016.

The Institute has been subject to controversy by way of Chandler, who in 2018 was accused of links to Russian intelligence by Bob Seeley, a Conservative MP. Seeley claimed that he and other MPs had seen French intelligence documents from 2005 suggesting he was a counterintelligence concern; Chandler and the Institute strongly disputed the allegations. Labour MP Ben Bradshaw had called for a Parliamentary investigation into the Institute's funding and support the previous year. In 2018, Chandler filed a libel lawsuit in the U.S. District Court for the District of Columbia against a private investigator he alleges produced the information claiming to show his ties to Russian intelligence. In 2022 Bryant conceded that the claims about Chandler had subsequently been disproved.

Reports and advocacy

Current programmes and policies
The Institute currently has a number of programmes including: the global prosperity index, African prosperity, Central and Eastern European prosperity, UK prosperity, United States prosperity, Social Metrics Commission, global index of economic openness, cultural transformation, race equality commission, peace and reconciliation, courage in journalism, global people movements and the 21st century international development.

The Legatum Institute founded the 'Courage in Journalism' award in 2017 following the death of Daphne Caruana Galizia that same year. The award was created to highlight the dangers faced by journalists around the world and to support press freedom. In 2019, Jan Kuciak, a Slovakian Journalist who died in 2018 at the age of 27, was named the winner of the annual prize. In 2020, the award was given to Syrian journalist Raed Fares who ran Fresh Radio and was assassinated in Idlib. The panel of judges included award-winning journalist Christina Lamb among others. 

The Legatum Institute houses the Social Metrics Commission, founded in 2016 and chaired by its CEO Philippa Stroud, which published its first report into UK poverty levels in 2018. The report found that 14.4 million people were living in poverty in 2017, including 4.5 million children. On the 17th May 2019, the Department for Work and Pensions announced that it would adopt the Social Metrics Commission's methodology for measuring poverty in the UK. This was largely achieved due to the cross-party involvement and support of the new measure. The Commission's modelling was used by Baroness Stroud and the Legatum Institute in a campaign to call for the Chancellor of the Exchequer to retain the £20 Universal Credit uplift in Autumn 2021. The Institute estimated that "840,000" people would be shielded from poverty if the cut on Universal Credit was axed.

Legatum Prosperity Index

The Legatum Institute publishes the annual Legatum Prosperity Index, which measures prosperity across countries by applying a combination of material wealth and life satisfaction factors. The report has been in continuous publication since its launch in 2007 and has expanded its coverage from 50 countries to 167 in 2020.

Global People Movements programme 
The Institute also runs the Global People Movements programme, which considers the largest movement of forcibly displaced people since the Second World War.

Historic programmes
At the 2015 Africa Prosperity Summit, the Legatum Institute participated as a panellist during the session on "Stoking African Innovation: Ways and Means", which focused on addressing economic and social requirements. The same year, the Institute commissioned YouGov to investigate public attitudes towards capitalism, which highlighted a nearly universal belief that the biggest corporations in the world had become successful through cheating and at the expense of the environment.

In 2017, the Legatum Institute commissioned a poll by Populus, estimating the views of the general British public on the Institute's political priorities. The top priorities for respondents were: food and water; emergency services; universal healthcare; a good house; a decent well-paying job; and compulsory and free education. At the bottom were owning a car and cheap air travel. The British public:

 Favour public ownership of the UK's water, electricity, gas and railway sectors 
 Believe taxes should rise to provide more funding for the NHS 
 Support higher levels of regulation 
 Favour wage caps for CEOs 
 Favour worker representation at senior executive and board level 
 Support the abolition of zero hour contracts
 Hold an unfavourable view of 'capitalism; as a concept, viewing it as 'greedy', 'selfish' and 'corrupt'.

Writing in The Sunday Times, Will Clothier used the poll to reflect that "capitalism has delivered for too few".

In July 2018, Legatum Institute released a report linking "anxiety, self-harm and other mental illness with high social media use among young people". The report argued that this is damaging families and young people's relationships with other adults. More widely, Legatum Institute has advocated the use of parenting courses as a useful way of embedding parental skills and values to support children, but that the take up of these courses remains low due to stigma (people relating such courses incorrectly to 'troubled families' and 'poor parenting'), poor accessibility and lack of familiarity with the trainer's and facilitators.

Other initiatives
In October 2013, the Legatum Institute co-founded the Centre for Entrepreneurs (CFE) in partnership with entrepreneur Luke Johnson. Its intention is to research and communicate the positive impact of entrepreneurs on the economy and society. The CFE took ownership of Startup Britain in 2014 and has released research on the role universities should play in entrepreneurship and the benefits of offering entrepreneurship schemes to pre-release prisoners.

Role in Brexit 
The think tank has been widely characterised as influential in the Brexit debate. In July 2017, soon after the UK's EU referendum result, Legatum Institute formed the Special Trade Commission, headed by Shanker Singham (who backed remain in the run-up to the EU referendum) and included former New Zealand Ambassador and Permanent Representative to the World Trade Organization Crawford Falconer as a commissioner. This group provided reports looking at the UK's future trade negotiations. The Special Trade Commission's work was seen by some commentators as pushing for a "hard Brexit", although the Institute said their role was to support the referendum result and pointed out that the Institute took no public position in the lead-up to the EU referendum.

The Institute proposed using unmanned aerial vehicles to patrol the Republic of Ireland – Northern Ireland border issue post-Brexit. The solution, which by the report's own admission faced issues around cost and bad weather, was criticised – the Daily Telegraph describing it as being "held up to ridicule". The report proposed other potential measures including re-purposing the Special EU Programmes Body and creating a special economic zone, an idea also put forward by the Republic of Ireland's main opposition party. Crawford Falconer left the Special Trade Commission to become the Chief Trade Negotiation Adviser and Second Permanent Secretary for the Department for International Trade in June 2016. Shanker Singham left the institute in March 2018 to take his team to the Institute of Economic Affairs and Matthew Elliott left in May 2018. In May 2018, the institute announced it would end its Brexit-related research.

In June 2018 the UK’s Charity Commission said the Institute's 'Brexit Inflection Report' could be seen as seeking to achieve a "particular final outcome", something that would constitute political activity and an infringement of policy. The Institute was told to remove the report from its website.

Events
The Legatum Institute holds regular public events. In 2012 the Dalai Lama spoke at an event called "ethics for a more prosperous world". In 2015, they held an event which looked at the ownership and management of public assets. In 2018 they gathered thinkers from different perspectives and let them argue under the Chatham House Rule to promote debate.

Fellows
The following people are current Fellows at the Legatum Institute:

David Abulafia
Nicholas Crafts
Maurice Glasman
Oliver Letwin
Simon Mayall
Tim Montgomerie

Previous Fellows have included Peter Pomerantsev, Gisela Stuart and Matthew Elliott.

References

Think tanks based in the United Kingdom
Educational charities based in the United Kingdom